Carlo Schmid may refer to:

Carlo Schmid (German politician) (1896–1979), German academic and politician
Carlo Schmid (Swiss pilot) (born 1990), Swiss pilot
Carlo Schmid-Sutter (born 1950), Swiss politician